"Fieber" is the title of the "Austrian Song for the UEFA EURO 2008" by Christina Stürmer. The song was released on May 23, 2008. The song is on Stürmer's album laut-Los. It reached no.6 in the Austrian chart and no.11 in the German charts.

Music video 
The music video for "Fieber" shows Stürmer sitting outside watching the soccer game, and throughout the video, other sports fans join her and by the end of the video she has a crowd with her watching the game.

2008 singles
Christina Stürmer songs
2008 songs
Universal Music Group singles